Trioceros incornutus, the Ukinga hornless chameleon, is a species of chameleon found in Tanzania.

References

Trioceros
Reptiles described in 1932
Taxa named by Arthur Loveridge
Reptiles of Tanzania